The sixth European Parliament was the sixth five-year term of the elected European Parliament. It began on Tuesday 20 July 2004 in Strasbourg following the 2004 elections and ended after the 2009 elections.

Major events
 10–13 June 2004
 Elections to the Sixth Parliament.
 20 July 2004
 First meeting (constitutive session) of the Sixth Parliament.
 Giovanni Berlinguer presides as oldest member.
 Josep Borrell is elected as President of the European Parliament.
 22 July 2004
 Parliament approves José Manuel Barroso as President of the European Commission.
 27 September to 11 October 2004
 Parliamentary hearings for the European Commissioners.
 Parliament airs objections to Ingrida Udre, László Kovács, Neelie Kroes, Mariann Fischer-Boel and Rocco Buttiglione.
 Buttiglione is replaced by Franco Frattini, Ingrida Udre replaced by Andris Piebalgs and László Kovács reshuffled.
 18 November 2004
 The Barroso Commission is approved by Parliament.
 22 November 2004
 Barroso Commission takes office.
 12 December 2006
 Parliament approves Meglena Kuneva and Leonard Orban as new European Commissioners for Romania and Bulgaria.
 1 January 2007
 Accession of Romania and Bulgaria, their observers in Parliament become full MEPs.
 15 January 2007
 Hans-Gert Pöttering is elected President of the European Parliament.
 20 May 2007
 Election of Bulgarian MEPs.
 25 November 2007
 Election of Romanian MEPs.
 20 February 2008
 Parliament approves the Lisbon Treaty.

Activity

Major resolutions and positions

Committees

Summary

Temporary committees

Committees of enquiry

Delegations

Political groups

See membership below for details of size

Leadership

Presidents

Vice-Presidents

Quaestors

Chairs of the political groups

Membership

See List of members of the European Parliament 2004–2009 for the full list.
Groups

Apportionment

Secretariat

See also

Elections

Membership lists

Notes

References

External links
European Parliament
Explanation of codecision
European Parliament positions
European Parliament and European Council common positions
European Parliament Conciliation Committee Joint texts

 6